Li Na was the defending women's singles tournament champion, but lost to Serena Williams in the semifinals.

Victoria Azarenka defeated World No. 1 Williams in the final 2–6, 6–2, 7–6(8–6) to claim the title. This was Azarenka's second win against Williams during the year, and Williams' fourth and last loss of the year.

Marion Bartoli played the last match of her professional career and retired after losing to Simona Halep in the second round.

Seeds
The top eight seeds received a bye into the second round.

Draw

Finals

Top half

Section 1

Section 2

Bottom half

Section 3

Section 4

Qualifying draw

Seeds

Qualifiers

Lucky loser
  Monica Niculescu

Draw

First qualifier

Second qualifier

Third qualifier

Fourth qualifier

Fifth qualifier

Sixth qualifier

Seventh qualifier

Eighth qualifier

Ninth qualifier

Tenth qualifier

Eleventh qualifier

Twelfth qualifier

References
Main Draw
Qualifying Draw

2013 WTA Tour
Women's Singles